Dora Jar (born 1996) is an American bedroom pop musician from Northern California. Jar has released 2 EPs and 3 singles as of 2022. In the summer of 2022, she announced her first North American headlining tour set for November.

Early life
Born as Dora Jarkowski, Jar was born in New York City on October 12, 1996.

She was raised in Northern California. She later attended Choate Rosemary Hall, graduating in 2015.

Career
Jar released her debut EP, titled Digital Meadow, in 2021. The EP is a seven-song collection of her signature dreamy, surrealist pop and silky, ethereal voice. It was produced alongside composer Jared Solomon. On the song “Scab Song,” Jar notes that she wrote it she was 19, and on her way to Solomon's house to complete the track, had decided to speed it up as an ode to faster beating of a heart while listening to music. Digital Meadow included collaborators like Solomonophonic, Felix Joseph, Ralph Castelli, Vron and John DeBold.

Jar opened for The Neighbourhood's 2021 tour.

Jar released Comfortably In Pain, her second EP, in 2022. The EP received praise from critics at Pitchfork, NPR, and other publications, describing her flickering vocals and rock-pop to the likes of Faye Webster and St. Vincent.

Later that year, she appeared at The Great Escape festival and opened multiple dates of Billie Eilish's 2022 Happier Than Ever, The World Tour. In the summer of 2022, she signed to the Island Records imprint of Universal Music.

She released three singles, "Bumblebee", "Bump", and "Spell", before she announced her first North American, twelve-city-headlining tour. A music video was released for "Bump," which was directed by Jocelyn Antequil and plays with an Alice in Wonderland motif.

Jar has been listed on Vogue's "22 Rising Musicians Set To Rule 2022" and Alternative Press's "Rising Artists", among others.

A number of musicians such as Conan Gray and Remi Wolf cite Jar as a prominent influence in their work.

Discography
EPs
 Digital Meadow (2021)
 Comfortably In Pain (2022)

References 

Musicians from California
Bedroom pop musicians
1996 births
Living people